Chapelle Jaffe is a Canadian film, television and stage actress. She is most noted for winning the Canadian Film Award for Best Actress in a Non-Feature at the 29th Canadian Film Awards in 1978 for the television film One Night Stand, and receiving a Genie Award nomination for Best Supporting Actress at the 3rd Genie Awards in 1982 for The Amateur.

Jaffe also was in the cast of the original production of One Night Stand at the Tarragon Theatre in Toronto.

In 1977, Jaffe's acting in Red Emma brought her a nomination for an ACTRA Award for the best acting performance in TV.

She was the editor of the first edition of the Academy of Canadian Cinema and Television's Who's Who in Canadian Film and Television directory.

Jaffe also worked in the administrative dimension of entertainment, including being executive director of Vancouver's New Play Festival and Playwrights Theatre Centre.

Filmography

Film

Television

References

External links

20th-century Canadian actresses
21st-century Canadian actresses
Canadian film actresses
Canadian stage actresses
Canadian television actresses
Canadian Screen Award winners
Living people
Year of birth missing (living people)